Inspector Gadget is a media franchise that began in 1983 with the DIC Entertainment animated television series Inspector Gadget. Since the original series, there have been many spin-offs based on the show, including additional animated series, video games, and films.

The franchise follows the adventures of a powerful but dimwitted cyborg police inspector named Gadget as he investigates the criminal schemes of Dr. Claw and his organization, M.A.D., and fruitlessly attempts to stop him. However, neither side is aware that it is Gadget's niece, Penny, and her dog, Brain, who are truly responsible for thwarting M.A.D.

Main characters

Inspector Gadget/Mad Gadget
The main protagonist and titular character of the franchise, initially voiced by Don Adams. Gadget is a cyborg (part man, part machine) with thousands of high-tech gadgets installed in his body, which he activates with the phrase "go-go gadget" before naming the device. Gadget is powerful, lovable, caring and protective, and loyal to his career as a lawman, but he is also dim-witted, clueless, incompetent and gullible. In many ways Gadget was reminiscent of Maxwell Smart (also portrayed by Don Adams) from the Get Smart TV show, using similar catchphrases and manners of speech. However, his attire and absent-minded personality are much closer to Peter Sellers' portrayal of Inspector Clouseau from the classic The Pink Panther series of movies. In fact, in the original Inspector Gadget pilot, he has a mustache just like Inspector Clouseau's, which was removed in subsequent episodes possibly to satisfy a copyright claim by MGM. 

Gadget has a knack of inadvertently saving the day, usually without realizing he is doing so. Gadget loves his family more than anything and would do anything to keep them from harm, especially Penny. He was voiced by Don Adams in the original series and Inspector Gadget's Field Trip until Adams' retirement from voicing Gadget in 1999, Gary Owens and later Jesse White in the original series' pilot episode, Keith Scott in the KFC commercials in Australia and Maurice LaMarche in the Super Mario Bros. Super Show, Gadget and the Gadgetinis, the direct-to-video animated films, and various DIC Kids Network bumpers. For the 2015 series, the voice of Gadget is provided by Ivan Sherry. It is revealed in the first live action film that Gadget's real name is Jonathan "John" Brown. He is portrayed by Matthew Broderick in the first film and French Stewart in the sequel.

Dr. Claw
Dr. Claw is the main antagonist of the franchise. He is the leader of an evil crime syndicate called M.A.D. Only his arms are shown, wearing silver gauntlets with golden spiked wrist bands and a gold M.A.D. signet ring on one of the right middle fingers. A parody of Ernst Stavro Blofeld from the James Bond franchise, his face is never seen at all (except in the live action film) with only his hands and pet cat visible. On a Dr. Claw action figure, the face was covered by a sticker on the box, which meant the toy had to be bought for his face to be seen. He is ruthless, murderous, sinister, dark, sadistic, and greedy, and will do anything to rule the world and destroy Gadget. In Gadget and the Gadgetinis, he reveals that he thinks Gadget's idiocy is an act to taunt him. In the 2015 series, he is noticeably less competent and malicious and the crimes he commits are a lot more petty. He has been voiced by Frank Welker, Don Francks, Brian Drummond, Doug Rand, and Martin Roach. In the first live action film his name is revealed to be Sanford Scolex and he is portrayed by Rupert Everett. Tony Martin subsequently took over the role of Dr. Claw in the sequel.

Penny
Penny is Gadget's intelligent niece and the one who really stops Dr. Claw's evil schemes. She uses many high-tech devices to help her secretly solve the cases and stop the bad guys such as a computer book, a video watch, a laptop, and a holographic tablet. However, her meddling often leads to her getting kidnapped by the villains, which leaves Brain to rescue her. She is 10 in the original series, 12 in Gadget and the Gadgetinis, 16 in Inspector Gadget's Biggest Caper Ever, and 14 (later turning 15) in the 2015 series. Penny loves her uncle more than anything, which is why she is always ready to help him behind his back, but on a few occasions she gets annoyed by his stupidity. In Inspector Gadget's Biggest Caper Ever, she is notably more selfish, and unlike any other version, she doesn't try to help her uncle at all. In the 2015 series, she has become an agent in training, is more physically active than in previous versions, and she has a crush on Dr. Claw's nephew, Talon.

For the original series, her voice was portrayed by Mona Marshall in the pilot episode, Cree Summer in the first season, and Holly Berger in the second season. In the commercials for KFC in Australia, she was voiced by Robyn Moore. Erica Horn provided her voice in Inspector Gadget Saves Christmas. From 2001 to 2005, she was voiced by Tegan Moss. Tara Strong voices her in the 2015 series. In the first live action film she is portrayed by Michelle Trachtenberg. Caitlin Wachs portrays her in the sequel.

Brain
Brain is Gadget and Penny's shy but intelligent, sweet, lovable and curious 4-(later 5)-year-old dog. He is the only one who knows that Penny is the one who really saves the world. Brain usually has the job of keeping Gadget safe on his missions while Penny investigates M.A.D's crimes. He usually disguises himself when following Gadget, which often causes Gadget to think he's a M.A.D Agent. He is absent in Gadget and the Gadgetinis and only shows up in pictures. The reason given for why he is absent is because after all the years of secretly helping Gadget, he has become phobic of gadgets, Gadget, and the word itself. He ran away to a riverside shack to get away from Gadget. He returned in the episode, No Brainer, where Penny made him a translation collar in order to help find Gadget. However, he does return in later spinoffs.

His voice was played in the original series by Frank Welker, Maurice LaMarche in Gadget and the Gadgetinis, and Scott McCord in the 2015 series. Lee Tockar voiced him in Inspector Gadget's Biggest Caper Ever. In the first live action film he is voiced by Don Adams. In the sequel he is voiced by Jeff Bennett. In the Australian KFC commercials he was voiced by Keith Scott.

Chief Quimby
Chief Quimby is Gadget's boss and the chief of the metro city police (Roverton Police Department In The Live Action Disney films). He usually pops up near the beginning of each episode to give Gadget a sheet of paper describing his mission. Once Gadget finishes reading them, the paper self-destructs and blows up in Quimby's face in a parody of Mission: Impossible. He appears at the end to congratulate Gadget and give him full credit for stopping Dr. Claw. He is unaware that Penny did all the work, even though she always calls him. In Gadget and the Gadgetinis, he has become an agent for the CIA. In the 2015 series, he is given glasses, and his hair is blonde instead of brown. He was mentioned by Gadget in some episodes of Inspector Gadget's Field Trip.

His voice in the original series was provided by John Stephenson in the pilot, Dan Hennessey in the first season, and Maurice LaMarche for the second season and the 1992 Christmas Special. Jim Byrnes voiced him in Inspector Gadget's Last Case. He is voiced by Derek McGrath in the 2015 series. In the first live action film he is portrayed by Dabney Coleman. Mark Mitchell portrays him in the sequel.

Recurring characters

Series and television specials

Inspector Gadget (1983)

The original animated television series in the franchise, Inspector Gadget, debuted in 1983 and introduced audiences to the adventures of a clumsy, simple-witted bionic detective named Inspector Gadget – a human being with various bionic gadgets built into his body. Gadget's nemesis is Dr. Claw, the leader of an evil organization, known as "M.A.D."

Inspector Gadget was the first TV series from DiC Entertainment to be produced directly for syndication. Its two seasons originally ran from 1983 to 1986 and remained in syndication into the late 1990s.

Inspector Gadget Saves Christmas

In 1992, DiC produced an animated Christmas special based on the series, Inspector Gadget Saves Christmas. In the special, Dr. Claw has locked up Santa Claus at the North Pole and hypnotized his elves, forcing them to break all toys that are being produced. Inspector Gadget, Penny, and Brain travel to the North Pole in an attempt to stop Dr. Claw and save Christmas. This special was nominated for an Emmy. Don Adams, Frank Welker, Erica Horn and Maurice LaMarche provide the voices for the characters.

Gadget Boy & Heather

The 1995 Gadget Boy and Heather series was a spinoff from the original show. The series is about a younger version of Gadget, "Gadget Boy" (also voiced by Don Adams). Instead of Penny and Brain the Dog, Gadget Boy was assisted by the resourceful Heather (voiced by Tara Strong). Just as maladroit as his adult self is, Gadget Boy was usually bailed out of situations by the more practical Heather, though he was also helped greatly by his myriad of high-tech gadgets and extendable arms and legs. In this series, traditional nemesis Dr. Claw was replaced by the villainess Spydra. In addition, the chief, Strombolli had a "fax tie" that exploded after the mission was read, continuing the running gag from the original series in which Chief Quimby would get blown up by an exploding message.

Gadget Boy's Adventures in History
Two years later, in 1997, Gadget Boy & Heather spawned an educational spinoff, Gadget Boy's Adventures in History, which aired on The History Channel. This series marked the last time Don Adams would perform a voice role for an animated Gadget series two years before his retirement from voicing an animated Gadget in 1999 and eight years before his death in 2005.

Inspector Gadget's Field Trip

In 1996, Gadget took students around the world in this series of 50 field trips, mainly created to market to stations to fulfill the FCC E/I requirements. The show put an animated Inspector Gadget on top of live-action filming of the locations that Gadget guided viewers through. Don Adams returned as Gadget's voice while Penny, Brain, Chief Quimby (although mentioned by Gadget in some episodes), Capeman and Dr. Claw are entirely absent.

Gadget & the Gadgetinis

In 2002, the French studio SIP Animation (Saban International Paris), in cooperation with DiC, produced 52 episodes of the then-new TV series Gadget and the Gadgetinis. The series debuted on Channel 5 in the UK in August 2002, followed by French channel M6 in September 2002 and then on Fox Kids channels across Europe from 2003. It was planned to air in the United States on Fox Family, but after the Channel was acquired by Disney in 2001 it never did and so it has never aired in the United States.

Inspector Gadget (again voiced by Maurice LaMarche) is now a member of an organization called "WOMP" (World Organization of Mega Powers) and is now, Lieutenant Gadget. He is still aided in his work by Penny (who is now twelve years old), as well as the new robot characters Digit and Fidget, the titular Gadgetinis invented by Penny, due to Brain running away. It follows the same plot as the original series, with the dim-witted Gadget attempting to fight crime on his own, while Penny and her helpers secretly do all the work. Dr. Claw, now with the first name George, returns as the main villain, with his relatives introduced in some episodes. In some stories, he is replaced by other villains.

The production values of this series were higher than any of the previous revivals and spinoff series. Also, the original creators of Inspector Gadget were all involved: Andy Heyward was one of the executive producers; Jean Chalopin wrote or co-wrote all the episodes, in addition to being credited as the new show's creator; whereas Bruno Bianchi directed and produced the series.

Inspector Gadget (2015)

A new computer-animated Inspector Gadget TV series had been in development since at least the start of 2012, possibly earlier. It was commissioned by Teletoon Canada, which aired the show, and put into preproduction by The Cookie Jar Company. In January 2012, the then-in-development show was mentioned by Ray Sharma, the CEO of XMG Studio, which produced the hit mobile game "Inspector Gadget: M.A.D. Dash". Sharma described how the success of the game had resulted in a new TV series having been in the making: "We did 1 million downloads in a week, and it's reinvigorated the TV brand with a new TV series in production."

In September 2012, Cookie Jar issued a short press release about the then-upcoming series, as part of the advertising for it during the MIPCOM market that October, stating: "Cookie Jar Entertainment is celebrating Inspector Gadget’s 30th anniversary with the launch of a brand-new series with its Canadian broadcast partner TELETOON. The series will again revolve around the iconic bionic bumbling detective." On June 9, 2013, Teletoon officially announced the reboot show with two press pictures of Gadget's new look as well as a press release: "MAD Agents, look out! Criminals, beware! Bystanders … take cover! Inspector Gadget is back to battle Dr. Claw with all-new gadgets – and all-new gadget-related chaos. But the loveable, bumbling, accidentally-destructive Inspector is not alone in the fight to take down MAD. His ever trusty police-dog, Brain, is still by his side and he's getting extra crime-fighting help from his new partner, Inspector-in-training Penny (voiced by Tara Strong). With MAD more powerful than ever and with the arrival of Dr. Claw's evil-genius (and totally crush-worthy) nephew Talon, Penny and Brain will need to use every ounce of their training to keep the world safe from Dr. Claw … and Gadget."

Unlike the other shows, Penny is more of the protagonist and Dr. Claw is as incompetent and useless as Gadget (if not more so). The series was produced by DHX Media, which purchased Cookie Jar in 2012. According to a DHX Media distribution catalogue released as a PDF on January 15, 2014, the show premiered in 2015 on Netflix.

On December 4, 2014, it was announced that the series has 26 episodes and that it would air on Boomerang's international channels in 2015. The series premiered on Boomerang in Australia on January 5, 2015.

Films

Live action

Inspector Gadget was adapted into a 1999 live action film by Walt Disney Pictures, starring Matthew Broderick as the title character and Rupert Everett as Dr. Claw. As opposed to the animated series, where Gadget is bumbling and clueless and Dr. Claw's face is never shown, Gadget appears to be more reliable and competent in detective work and Dr. Claw's face appears many times in the film. In addition, Gadget and Dr. Claw were also given civilian names; Jonathan "John" Brown and Sanford Scolex, respectively.

A second film, Inspector Gadget 2 featured many changes from the first one, such as Doctor Bradford no longer assisting Gadget or being his romantic interest, instead being replaced by a well-meaning and upbeat scientist named Baxter and a new romantic interest named G2 and Gadget and Claw's civilian names are no longer mentioned. Being a year later in the movie's timeline, Gadget had begun displaying his cartoon namesake's glitches by receiving the wrong gadget when he calls out a specific device. He falls in love with his intended replacement: the fully robotic G2. Furthermore, none of the cast from the first film returned to their roles except D.L. Hughley.

Reboot
In May 2015, it was announced that a new film with a rebooted version of the character is in the works. Like the live-action films, it will be done by Disney, with Dan Lin producing it. In October 2019, Mikey Day and Streeter Seidell were hired to write the film.

Animated

Inspector Gadget: Gadget's Greatest Gadgets
Released on VHS by Buena Vista Home Video in March 2000 to coincide with Disney's live action theatrical film, Inspector Gadget: Gadget's Greatest Gadgets takes the format of a clip show in which Gadget has a flashback to his past adventures in the original TV series, using footage from the episodes "The Capeman Cometh", "Prince of the Gypsies", and "Gadget's Gadgets"; as well as some stock footage from Inspector Gadget's Field Trip for the present-day segments. Maurice LaMarche did Inspector Gadget's voice in the modern segments, marking his first cartoon voice appearance as Gadget, who had previously been voiced by Don Adams. Original series actors Cree Summer and Frank Welker reprised their roles as Penny, Brain and Dr. Claw in the modern segments.

Inspector Gadget's Last Case
In 2002, as part of the DIC Movie Toons series of movies, DIC released a full-length animated television film called Inspector Gadget's Last Case, directed by Michael Maliani. It premiered on television on October 6, 2002, on Nickelodeon and was released on DVD and VHS shortly afterward by MGM Home Entertainment.

The film is about Inspector Gadget giving up his beloved but aging Gadgetmobile, while his archenemy Dr. Claw uses a competing crime fighter to discredit Gadget and cost him his badge. Penny and Brain make appearances as minor supporting characters. In this, Gadget is more competent, yet he is still bumbling, similar to his persona in the pilot episode and his Mathew Broderick counterpart. Even though the film uses the same character designs as the concurrent Gadget & The Gadgetinis TV series, SIP Animation wasn't involved with the production of this movie. Maurice LaMarche reprised the role of Gadget in this film and Jaleel White voiced the Gadgetmobile. In most European regions, the movie aired on Disney Channel or Toon Disney. In Germany, the film aired on Cartoon Network.

Inspector Gadget's Biggest Caper Ever
2005's Inspector Gadget's Biggest Caper Ever was the first Inspector Gadget animated production to be completely rendered using 3D computer animation. It returned Gadget to his familiar trenchcoat from the original series. Brain is also back in his old role, while Penny is now 16 years old. Gadget is again voiced by Maurice LaMarche and Penny and Claw are once again voiced by Tegan Moss and Brian Drummond, while Bernie Mac voices the Gadgetmobile. The plot features Dr. Claw breaking out of jail with the help of a specially hired Scottish agent named Bombaboy. He and Bombaboy seek out a prehistoric dragon-like creature to get revenge on his captors and launch yet another scheme to conquer the world. Production on the film was announced in May 2004, under the working title Inspector Gadget Saves the Day... Maybe, and the film was released on September 6, 2005, by Lions Gate Home Entertainment.

Cancelled projects

Gadget Girl
In November 1992, DIC announced they would be developing a spin-off titled Gadget Girl, featuring a female protagonist. In 1994, Bohbot Entertainment acquired US-syndication rights for airing on their Amazin' Adventures block. However, the series would never see the light of day.

During the development of fellow Gadget spin-off Gadget Boy, it was confirmed by staff that Gadget Girl was one of the many ideas in what would become Gadget Boy.

GI Gadget
In 1999, DIC announced they would be co-producing a new Inspector Gadget series to cash-in on the success of the live-action movie tentatively titled GI Gadget, which would be co-produced with French-animation studio Arles Animation. GI Gadget have featured the titular character joining an elite army commando unit. The series was planned to start with a TV Movie in 2000 and the full series in 2001, but nothing else was mentioned of the series and was silently canceled not long after. Arles Animation would later be purchased by BKN International in June of that year.

Unnamed 2009 series
In April 2008, a new Inspector Gadget series was announced to premiere in Spring 2009 to celebrate the franchise's 25th anniversary. The series would have taken a darker tone than the other Inspector Gadget series, featuring a 2D/3D animesque art style with cinematic camera angles and dramatic musical cues, as well as new villains alongside Dr. Claw. The series was never produced, and was canceled likely due to DIC's purchase by Cookie Jar Entertainment in July 2008.

Video games
The first game developed based on the series was Inspector Gadget and the Circus of Fear developed by Beam Software and scheduled for release by Melbourne House in the UK in 1987 for the Commodore 64 and ZX Spectrum. It resembled the arcade title Metro-Cross and was a left-to-right scrolling racing/jumping game with a quasi-isometric forced 3d perspective. Although the game was completed, and preview copies were reviewed (unfavourably) in the computing press, it was scrapped on the verge of release. The game featured a cameo by the titular character from the Horace series of games. An adventure game based on the series, Inspector Gadget: Mission 1 – Global Terror! was eventually released on the PC in 1990 by a company called Azeroth.

An LCD Electronic Inspector Gadget developed by Bandai was released in 1984.

An NES game was planned for release by Hudson Soft, but was quietly cancelled. Instead, Hudson released an SNES game in 1993 simply called Inspector Gadget. The game features a rare glimpse of Dr. Claw's face.

In March 2000, it was announced that Ubi Soft had teamed with Light & Shadow Production to release an Inspector Gadget game for the PlayStation. That game was revealed as Inspector Gadget: Gadget's Crazy Maze, with a Game Boy Color title Inspector Gadget: Operation Madkactus, following as well.

After this partnership, Light and Shadow Production released three Inspector Gadget titles on their own - Inspector Gadget: Advance Mission for Game Boy Advance (Published by DreamCatcher Interactive in the United States) and two European-exclusive titles - Inspector Gadget: Mad Robots Invasion for the PlayStation 2 and Inspector Gadget Racing for the Game Boy Advance.

After Light & Shadow Production was purchased by Hip Games, the latter company released Gadget & Gadgetinis for the PlayStation 2 and PC in Europe.

Inspector Gadget's MAD Dash was released for iOS devices, iPhone and iPod Touch, by XMG Studio in 2010. It features Shuki Levy's original theme music and also includes original voices from the show. In the same game, Doctor Claw reveals his face and is once again given the first name George.

Music
The original Inspector Gadget theme song was composed by American composer Shuki Levy (who also wrote the themes for Power Rangers and Digimon), and was based on Edvard Grieg's "In the Hall of the Mountain King".

Several early rap records sampling the Inspector Gadget theme song were released in 1985. The Kartoon Krew also released "Inspector Gadget" on ZYX Music, which contains vocal samples and quotes from the popular cartoon series, reenacted by the rap group for the song. East New York rap group Bad Boys & K-Love released a record on Starlite Records, "Bad Boys", featured on the UK hip hop compilation Street Sounds Electro 9. Following the trend, Slick Rick and Doug E. Fresh used samples from the Inspector Gadget theme song on their single "The Show". The theme song has been heavily sampled in the years since then. California-based punk band Lagwagon recorded a short instrumental cover of the theme song on their 1992 album Duh.

The new (2015) theme was composed by Canadian film and TV composers Stephen Skratt and Asher Lenz, "once again using In the Hall of the Mountain King as inspiration".

Books
A new Inspector Gadget comic book, based on the original 1983 TV series, was launched in the U.S. by Viper Comics in 2011. A preview issue was published as part of Free Comic Book Day on May 7, 2011; the entire story was then released officially in August as a 48-page comic book titled "Inspector Gadget: Gadget on the Orient Express". The comic book was written by Dale Mettam and illustrated by José Cobá. No follow-up issues have been released to date.

Other appearances
On a 1989 episode of The Super Mario Bros. Super Show!, another DiC production, a live-action bumper segment titled "Defective Gadgetry" had a guest appearance by Inspector Gadget, in which he came to the Mario Bros. for help in repairing him. This was his first live-action appearance predating the 1999 live action film that was released ten years later. Maurice LaMarche (who would assume the voice role in "Inspector Gadget: Gadget's Greatest Gadgets" ten years later) plays Gadget in this segment. A second live-action segment, "Treasure of the Sierra Brooklyn" had Gadget returning to help the Mario Bros. find a lost treasure.

The Robot Chicken episode "Adoption's an Option" featured a sketch featuring the Inspector Gadget characters in a parody of The Terminator. In this sketch, Gadget replaces a faulty part with a Cyberdyne part, only to be turned into an unstoppable killing machine when Skynet goes online. The sketch goes on to revolve around Penny and Brain trying to avoid being killed by the now-evil Gadget, eventually killing him in a factory. Meanwhile, Mad Cat dies of leukemia; at the end of the show, Dr. Claw blames Gadget for Mad Cat's death. Ironically, Dr. Claw claims that he somehow found out it was Penny and Brain who were behind all of Gadget's successful missions, and planned to gain control of Inspector Gadget via Skynet, and use him to kill them using the Cyberdyne technology that gained control of him. (Penny is voiced by Cree Summer and Brain & Dr. Claw by Frank Welker, who were the original voice actors for the characters.)

The 2019 video game Tales of the Neon Sea features a reference to Inspector Gadget in the form of a character called "Detective Gadget of Starlight City", who joined the police force on the 6th of September 2117 and was killed in action on August 5, 2126, protecting civilians.

In 2022, Gadget and Brain made a brief cameo appearance in a Renault Clio commercial made for France and Spain, featuring "Video Killed the Radio Star" by The Buggles.

Inspector Gadget has been the subject of internet memes parodying a 2012 Cinemassacre YouTube video by internet personality Mike Matei, titled "Minecraft with Gadget", where Inspector Gadget features as a co-host to Matei's review of Minecraft. Notable quotes, voiced by Matei, include "brown bricks" and "Minecrap", both of which have been referenced in the video game Deltarune.

References

External links
 
 
 
 
 

 
Television franchises
Comedy franchises
Fictional secret agents and spies in television
English-language television shows
Film series introduced in 1999
Walt Disney Studios (division) franchises